Keld Heick (born 24 February 1946 in Frederiksberg) is a Danish singer, songwriter and musician. He is best known for his contribution to the Dansk Melodi Grand Prix, where he has submitted over 30 songs.

In 1963 Heick formed the band Keld & the Donkeys. The band's big breakthrough came in 1966 with the song "Ved landsbyens gadekær" (eng. "At the village pond").

In 1976 he decided to merge his professional and personal life, when he made a duo with his wife Hilda Heick. They made their debut with the hit "Do you speak English?" and later had another hit with "Jeg ringer på fredag" (eng. "I'll call you this Friday").

Besides the music Keld Heick has also worked as a tv host. In 1996-1997 he was the host of Lykkehjulet the Danish version of Wheel of Fortune. From 1997 to 2002 he was the host of the music talkshow Musikbutikken on DR1.

Keld Heick married Hilda Heick in 1968. They have one daughter, Annette Heick.

Dansk Melodi Grand Prix

 1978 - Eventyr sung by Grethe Ingmann, finished 5th in the Melodi Grand Prix
 1979 - Disco Tango sung by Tommy Seebach, won the national final - finished 6th at the Eurovision Song Contest in Jeruselum
 1980 - Bye Bye sung by Lecia & Lucienne, finished 7th in the national final
 1981 - Krøller eller ej sung by Tommy Seebach & Debbie Cameron, won the national final - finished 11th at the Eurovision Song Contest in Dublin
 1982 - Hip hurra det' min fødselsdag sung by Tommy Seebach, finished 2nd in the national final
 1983 - Og livet går sung by Kirsten Siggaard & Sir Henry, finished 7th in the national final
 1984 - Pyjamas for to sung by Tommy Seebach, finished 4th in the national final
 1984 - Det' lige det sung by Hot Eyes, won the national final - finished 4th at the Eurovision Song Contest in Luxembourg
 1985 - Det' det jeg altid har sagt sung by Tommy Seebach finished 2nd in the national final
 1985 - Sku' du spørge fra no'en? sung by Hot Eyes, won the national final - finished 11th at the Eurovision Song Contest in Gothenburg
 1986 - Mirakler sung by himself and Hilda Heick, finished 5th in the national final
 1986 - Sig det som det er sung by Hot Eyes, finished 4th in the national final
 1986 - Vil du med sung by Birthe Kjær, finished 2nd in the national final
 1987 - Farvel og tak sung by Hot Eyes, finished 5th in the national final
 1987 - Ha' det godt sung by himself and Hilda Heick, finished 6th in the national final
 1987 - Hva' er du ude på sung by Birthe Kjær, finished 2nd in the national final
 1987 - Det' gratis sung by Tommy Seebach, finished 4th in the national final
 1988 - Ka' du se hva' jeg sa'? sung by Hot Eyes, won the national final - finished 3rd at the Eurovision Song Contest in Dublin
 1988 - Det' okay' sung by Henriette Lykke, finished 3rd in the national final
 1989 - Vi maler byen rød sung by Birthe Kjær, won the national final - finished 3rd at the Eurovision Song Contest in Lausanne
 1989 - Sommerregn sung by himself and Hilda Heick, finished 7th in the national final
 1989 - Endnu en nat sung by Gry Johansen, finished 6th in the national final
 1990 - Hallo Hallo sung by Lonnie Devantier, won the national final - finished 8th at the Eurovision Song Contest in Zagreb
 1990 - Kender du typen sung by Käte & Per, failed to make it to the national final
 1991 - Din musik min musik sung by Birthe Kjær, finished 3rd in the national final
 1991 - Casino sung by Pernille Petterson, finished 6th in the national final
 1991 - Du er musikken i mit liv' sung by Annette Heick & Egil Eldøen, finished 4th in the national final
 1992 - Det vil vi da blæse på sung by himself as Sweet Keld & the Hilda Hearts, finished 5th in the national final
 1993 - Under stjernerne på himlen sung by Tommy Seebach, won the national final - finished 22nd at the Eurovision Song Contest in Millstreet
 1996 - Kun med dig sung by Dorthe Andersen and Martin Loft, won the national final, but didn't however qualify for the Eurovision Song Contest in Oslo.

Heick submitted three other songs in 1993, 1996 and 1999 but they failed to get to the national final.

References

External links
 Bio at 24

1946 births
Living people
People from Frederiksberg
20th-century Danish male singers
Danish songwriters
Danish male  singer-songwriters
Danish television presenters
Dansk Melodi Grand Prix contestants
Denmark in the Eurovision Song Contest